This is a list of notable authors of erotic literature.

Sex manuals 

 Vatsayana, famous for the Kama Sutra
 Yasodhara, author of the Jayamangala
 Kokkoka, author of the Ratirahasya
 Kalyanamalla, author of the Ananga Ranga
 Praudha Devaraya, author of the Ratiratna Pradipika
 Ovid, Roman author famous for the Ars Amatoria
 Ge Hong,  Jin dynasty author of Pao-Pu Zhi
 Muhammad ibn Muhammad al-Nafzawi, author of The Perfumed Garden
 Hua Tuo,  author of On Venereal disease.
 Sun Simiao,  author of On the Loss and Gain of The Chamber Art
 Wan Quan,  author of Essentials for Extending Posterity
 Gao Lian,  author of On Abstinence in Sex
 Alex Comfort, author of The Joy of Sex

Sex in fiction 
Jacques Abeille, author of De la vie d'une chienne and other erotic books
Kathy Acker, postmodern pornographer, author of I Dreamt I Was A Nymphomaniac
Laura Antoniou, author of The Marketplace
Emmanuelle Arsan, author of the novel Emmanuelle and various other works
Aran Ashe
Ivan Barkov
Georges Bataille, author of Story of the Eye
Giovanni Boccaccio, Italian author contemporary and friend of Petrarch; wrote Decameron a collection of 100 short stories, some of which are erotic, considered masterpieces of the genre.
Susie Bright
Patrick (Pat) Califia, author of Macho Sluts
Nicolas Chorier – author of L'académie des dames
M. Christian, author of The Bachelor Machine and other works
John Cleland, author of Fanny HillGuy Davenport
Sylvia Day
Daniel Defoe, author of Moll FlandersAndreas Embirikos, author of The Great EasternEsparbec, author of La PharmacienneSunil Gangopadhyay, Bengali Indian author who wrote maximum number of erotic novels in Bengali literature
Elias Gaucher
Günter Grass, author of The Tin Drum and Cat and MouseMaxim Jakubowski, editor of the Mammoth Erotica series and a major erotica writer in his own right
Yasunari Kawabata, author of Beauty and SadnessCaitlín R. Kiernan — author of Frog Toes and Tentacles, Tales from the Woeful Platypus, and Sirenia DigestD. H. Lawrence, author of Lady Chatterley's LoverWilliam Levy
Marilyn Jaye Lewis, author of Neptune and Surf and Lust: Bisexual EroticaBarry N. Malzberg, author of Screen and writer/editor for Olympia Press
Henry Miller, author of Tropic of CancerYukio Mishima, author of the homoerotic novels Forbidden Colors and Confessions of a MaskA. R. Morlan
Vladimir Nabokov, Russian-born English-language writer, author of LolitaTaslima Nasrin, Bangladeshi author who wrote "Lajja" in 1993, an explicit sexual book. 
Anaïs Nin, author of Delta of VenusKenzaburō Ōe, author of Seventeen, J, and A Personal MatterAlexander Pushkin, author of the GabrieliadPauline Réage, author of Story of OAnne Rice, also writing as A. N. Roquelaure
Catherine Robbe-Grillet, writing as Jean de Berg and Jeanne de Berg
Leopold von Sacher-Masoch, author of Venus in FursThe Marquis de Sade, author of Justine, or the Misfortunes of VirtueMitzi Szereto, author of The Wilde Passions of Dorian Gray, Pride and Prejudice: Hidden Lusts, and Phantom: The Immortal, among others.
William Simpson Potter, author of Romance of LustJun'ichirō Tanizaki, author of The Key, Naomi, and QuicksandTamara Thorne, author of the Sorority series
Alexander Trocchi
Mark Twain, author of 1601Marco Vassi, author of "The Erotic Comedies", "Devil's Sperm Is Cold", and "The Stoned Apocalypse"
Mario Vargas Llosa, author of The Notebooks of Don RigobertoZane.

 Chinese erotica 
Li Yu, author of The Carnal Prayer MatLanling Xiaoxiao Sheng, author of Jin Ping MeiLü Tiancheng, author of The Embroidered CouchDavid Tod Roy, translator and editor of The Plum in the Garden Vase Poetry 

Ovid, Roman erotic poet
Catullus, Roman erotic poet
Sextus Propertius, Roman poet
Sappho, Greek poet from the island of Lesbos who wrote love poetry to young women.
Petrarch, Italian poet, considered, together with Dante, the father of Renaissance. His love sonnets dedicated to Laura are masterpieces of erotic poetry
Bai Juyi,  Romantic poet of Tang dynasty
King Solomon, Author, according to Judeo-Christian tradition, of the Song of Songs.
John Donne, 17th-18th century British poet. Books: "Poems", "Love Poems".
John Wilmot, 2nd Earl of Rochester, British 17th Century libertine
Hồ Xuân Hương, 18th-19th century Vietnamese poet
Pietro Aretino, Italian poet. Books: "The School of Whoredom", "The Secret Life of Nuns", "Sonetti Lussuriosi e Dubbi Amorosi", "The Secret Life of Wives", "La Cortigiana", "Ragionamenti".
Manuel Maria Barbosa du Bocage, Portuguese poet. Books: "Poesias Eróticas, Burlescas e Satíricas", "Os Amores", "Opera Omnia".
Pierre Louys, Belgian poet. Books: "Poesies Erotiques: la femme, les vulves legendaires", "Les soeurs à l'envers", "Oeuvre Erotique", "Le nom de la femme", "Le femme et le Pantin", "Trois filles de leur mére", "Les cahiers de la Nrf", "Les chansons de Bilitis", "Manual da Civilidade Destinado às Meninas para uso nas Escolas".
Gregório de Mattos, Brazilian poet. Books: "Poemas Satíricos", "Para que todos entendais poesia", "Desenganos da vida humana e outros poema".
Olga Savary, Brazilian poet. Books: "Espelho Provisório", "Sumidouro", "Altaonda", "Magma", "Natureza Viva", "Hai-Kais", "Linha d'água", "Berço Esplendido", "Retratos", "Rudá", "Éden Hades", "Morte de Moema", "Anima Animalis", "O Olhar Dourado do Abismo", "Repertório Selvagem".
Hilda Hilst, Brazilian poet. Books: "Fico Besta Quando me Entendem", "Da Poesia", "Porno Chic", "De Amor Tenho Vivido", "Cantares", "Baladas", "A Obscena Senhora D", "Obscenica", "O Caderno Rosa de Lori Lamby", "Tu Não Te Moves de Ti", "Contos D'Escárnio/Textos Grotescos", "Fluxo Floema", "Cartas de um Sedutor", "Kadosh", "Como Meus Olhos de Cão", "Poemas Malditos, Gozosos e Devotos", "Do Desejo", "Rutilos", "Exercícios".
Glauco Mattoso, Brazilian poet. Books: "Memórias de um Pueteiro", "Línguas na Papa", "O Calvário dos Carecas: História do Trote Estudantil", "Rockabillyrics", "Limeiriques & Outros Debiques Glauquianos", "Haicais Paulistanos", "Galeria Alegria", "O Glosador Motejoso", "Animalesca Escolha", "Pegadas Noturnas: Dissonetos Barrockistas", "Poética na Política", "Poesia Digesta", "A Planta da Donzela", "A Aranha Punk", "A Letra da Ley", "O Cancioneiro Carioca e Brasileiro", "Contos Hediondos", "Cinco Ciclos e Meio Século", "Tripé do Tripúdio e Outros Contos Hediondos", "Raymundo Curupyra, O Caypora: Romance Lyrico", "Cautos Causos", "Outros Cautos Causos", "Sacola de Feira", "Poesia Vaginal: Cem Sonnettos Sacanas", "Curso de Refeologia", "Graphophobia", "Arachnophobia", "Testamento satanista".
Cairo Trindade, Brazilian poet. Books: "PoetAstro", "Saca na geral", "Liberatura", "Poematemagia", "Poesya, que porra é essa?".
Paula Taitelbaum, Brazilian poet. Books: "Sem Vergonha", "Mundo da Lua", "Porno Pop Pocket", "Menage a Trois".
Vinni Corrêa, Brazilian poet. Books: "Coma de 4", "Literatura de Bordel", "Lunch Box", "Sexo a Três".

 Autobiography 

 Emmanuelle Arsan, author of Emmanuelle Vanessa Duriès, author of Le lien Nancy Friday
 Henry Spencer Ashbee, author of My Secret Life Frank Harris, multiple-volume memoir My Life and Loves Catherine Millet, author of The Sexual Life of Catherine M. Georges Simenon
 Edward Avery, editor of The Autobiography of a Flea 
 Xaviera Hollander, author of The Happy Hooker''
 D.B. Dale, author of Memoirs of Darkness

Erotica